The Blâme, is a short river in the region of Nouvelle-Aquitaine in France, a left tributary of the Auvézère. It flows entirely within the department of Dordogne.

Geography
The Blâme is a left tributary of the Auvézère river. It empties into the Auvézère slightly east of the commune of La Boissière-d'Ans with a small waterfall near La Forge d'Ans. Its source is the spring Puits de Bontemps, 1.5 km south of Brouchaud.

The Blâme has one tributary, the small river Soue (also called Lassoue). The two rivers join at the village of Brouchaud.

See also
 List of rivers of France

References

External links
 The Dordogne equipment side (glossary) : see the article Artesian source, illustrated by a view of the Puits de Bontemps, available only in French 

Rivers of France
Rivers of Dordogne
Rivers of Nouvelle-Aquitaine